This article attempts to list the oldest extant buildings surviving in the state of North Carolina in the United States of America, including the oldest houses in North Carolina and any other surviving structures. Some dates are approximate and based upon dendochronology, architectural studies, and historical records. Sites on the list are generally from the First Period of American architecture or earlier.
To be listed here a site must:
 date from prior to 1776; or
 be the oldest building in a county, large city, or oldest of its type (church, government building, etc.),

See also
 List of the oldest buildings in the United States
 List of plantations in North Carolina
 National Register of Historic Places listings in North Carolina

References 

North Carolina
Architecture in North Carolina
Oldest